The Act of Uniformity 1549, was an Act of the Parliament of England, passed on 21 January 1549.

It was the logical successor of the Edwardian Injunctions of 1547 and the Sacrament Act of the same year which had taken piecemeal steps towards the official introduction of Protestant doctrine and practice into England and Wales. It established the 1549 version of the Book of Common Prayer as the sole legal form of worship in England. Before 1549, the churches of England used various different versions of the Latin-language Missal.

Nature of the Book of Common Prayer
The Book of Common Prayer was far from just an English-language translation of the Latin liturgical books; it was largely a new creation, mainly the work of Archbishop Thomas Cranmer, which in its text and its ceremonial directions reflected various reforming doctrinal influences (notably the breviary of Cardinal Quiñonez and the Consultation of Hermann von Wied). The first Act (2 & 3 Edw 6 c 1) was called An Act for Uniformity of Service and Administration of the Sacraments throughout the Realm. It deemed as follows:
and that all and singular ministers in any cathedral or parish church or other place within this realm of England, Wales, Calais, and the marches of the same, or other the king's dominions, shall, from and after the feast of Pentecost next coming, be bound to say and use the Matins, Evensong, celebration of the Lord's Supper, commonly called the Mass, and administration of each of the sacraments, and all their common and open prayer, in such order and form as is mentioned in the said book, and none other or otherwise
This section covers the following three points. England claimed many territories as its own with the phrase "or other of the king’s dominions".  And that there was plenty of time for England's territories to become accustomed to these new laws giving them approximately one year to use the Book of Common Prayer to unify the country behind a single common practice of Faith.
Then follow penalties against those of the clergy that should substitute any other form of service, or shall not use the Book of Common Prayer, or who shall preach or speak against it: 
lest any obstinate person who willingly would disturb so godly order and quiet in his realm should not go unpunished, that it may also be ordained and enacted by the authority aforesaid, that if any manner of parson, vicar, or other whatsoever minister, that ought or should sing or say common prayer mentioned in the said book, or minister the sacraments, shall after the said feast of Pentecost next coming refuse to use the said common prayers, or to minister the sacraments in such cathedral or parish church or other places as he should use or minister the same, in such order and form as they be mentioned and set forth in the said book or shall use, wilfully and obstinately standing in the same, any other rite, ceremony, order, form, or manner of Mass openly or privily, or Matins, Evensong, administration of the sacraments, or other open prayer that is mentioned and set forth in the said book; or shall preach, declare, or speak anything in the derogation or depraving of the said book, or anything therein contained, or of any part thereof; and shall be thereof lawfully convicted according to the laws of this realm, by verdict of twelve men, or by his own confession, or by the notorious evidence of the fact, shall lose and forfeit to the king's highness, his heirs and successors, for his first offence, the profit of such one of his spiritual benefices or promotions as it shall please the king's highness to assign or appoint, coming and arising in one whole year next after his conviction: and also that the same person so convicted shall for the same offence suffer imprisonment by the space of six months, without bail or mainprize.

This provided loss of all income, which was forfeited to the Crown. Imprisonment "without bail or mainprize" meant one could not pay one's way out of prison, nor be given freedom until acquittal or the completion of the sentence.

A second offence was dealt with more harshly: 
and if any such person once convicted of any offence concerning the premises, shall after his first conviction again offend and be thereof in form aforesaid lawfully convicted, that then the same person shall for his second offence suffer imprisonment by the space of one whole year, and also shall therefore be deprived ipso facto of all his promotions; and that it shall be lawful to all patrons, donors, and grantees of all and singular the same spiritual promotions, to present to the same any other able clerk, in like manner and form as though the party so offending were dead;

A second offence added a year to the previous six months in prison, loss of livelihood, and any promotions and position would be given to another as if the miscreant had died.  A third offence was the harshest, punished by life in prison:
and that if any such person or persons, after he shall be twice convicted in form aforesaid, shall offend against any of the premises the third time, and shall be thereof in form aforesaid lawfully convicted, that then the person so offending and convicted the third time shall suffer imprisonment during his life.

Nothing in this Act enforced attendance at public worship, but the provisions of the Act apply to every kind of public worship or "open prayer", as it was called, which might take place. The Act itself defines "open prayer" as "that prayer which is for others to come unto or near, either in common churches or private chapels or oratories, commonly called the service of the Church". The Act of Uniformity 1549 was the first Act of its kind and was used to make religious worship across England and its territories consistent (i.e. uniform) at a time when the different branches of Christianity were pulling people in opposite directions, causing riots and crimes, particularly the Prayer Book Rebellion.  The Book of Common Prayer defined a middle ground for Christian faith within England; the Act of Uniformity 1549 mandated that all English subjects move to that middle ground, so that they could put aside their differences.

Preparation of the Act
The Act of Uniformity 1549 had been prepared by a committee chaired by the Archbishop of Canterbury, Thomas Cranmer. When this Bill was debated in the House of Lords in January 1549 it was very controversial. Of the eighteen bishops present at the final vote, ten voted in favour and eight against. Hostility to this Act and to the new prayer book led to rioting in some areas of the country, and a major uprising in Cornwall and the South West of England. They were resisted by Catholics on one side and radical reformers such as John Hooper on the other. Yet, Edward VI stated in his Act: 
that it may be ordained and enacted by his majesty, with the assent of the Lords and Commons in this present Parliament assembled, and by the authority of the same, that all and singular person and persons that have offended concerning the premises, other than such person and persons as now be and remain in ward in the Tower of London, or in the Fleet, may be pardoned thereof;
These words assured that it was not an Ex post facto law. Only those already convicted would remain prosecuted.

Later history of the Act
This Act was superseded in part by the Act of Uniformity 1552 which introduced the more Protestant prayer book of 1552 and imposed penalties for unjustified absence from Sunday worship; repealed by Mary I, sess. 2, c. 2; and revived in a modified form by Elizabeth in the Act of Uniformity 1559. At the restoration of the monarchy with Charles II the Act of Uniformity 1662 continued the major principles of 1549 in a rather different context and this later Act was reaffirmed in 1706 as a prelude to the Act of Union which united England and Scotland under one parliament. However, most of the Act of 1662 was repealed as part of the process of the removal of religious discrimination in the 19th century and the revision of statute law in the 20th.

Repeal
The words of commencement, wherever occurring, were repealed by section 1 of, and Schedule 1 to, the Statute Law Revision Act 1948.

The whole Act, in so far as it extended to Northern Ireland, was repealed by section 1(1) of, and Schedule 1 to, the Statute Law Revision Act 1950.

The whole Act, so far as unrepealed, except section 7, was repealed by section 1 of, and Part II of the Schedule to, the Statute Law (Repeals) Act 1969.

The whole Act, so far as unrepealed, was repealed by section 6(3) of, and Schedule 2 to, the Church of England (Worship and Doctrine) Measure 1974.

Section 1
In this section, the words from "that all and singuler person" to "thereof: And" were repealed by section 1 of, and Schedule 1 to, the Statute Law Revision Act 1948.

Section 3
This section, from "it is" to "aforesaide", was repealed by section 1 of, and Part I of the Schedule to, the Statute Law Revision Act 1888.

In this section, the words from "forfeit to our" to "and shall" were repealed by section 10(2) of and Part III of Schedule 3 to, the Criminal Law Act 1967.

Section 4
This section, from "it is" to "aforesaide", was repealed by section 1 of, and Part I of the Schedule to, the Statute Law Revision Act 1888.

Section 5
This section, from "and be it" to first "aforesaide", was repealed by section 1 of, and Part I of the Schedule to, the Statute Law Revision Act 1888.

This section was repealed by section 87 of, and Schedule 5 to, the Ecclesiastical Jurisdiction Measure 1963.

Section 8
This section, from "and be it" to first "aforesaide", was repealed by section 1 of, and Part I of the Schedule to, the Statute Law Revision Act 1888.

Section 9
This section, from "be it" to "aforesaide that", was repealed by section 1 of, and Part I of the Schedule to, the Statute Law Revision Act 1888.

Section 10
This section, from "and be it" to first "aforesaide", was repealed by section 1 of, and Part I of the Schedule to, the Statute Law Revision Act 1888.

This section was repealed by section 83(3) of, and Part III of Schedule 10 to, the Criminal Justice Act 1948.

Section 11
This section, from "and be it" to first "aforesaide", was repealed by section 1 of, and Part I of the Schedule to, the Statute Law Revision Act 1888.

This section was repealed by section 10(2) of and Part I of Schedule 3 to, the Criminal Law Act 1967.

Section 12
This section, from "and be it" to first "aforesaide", was repealed by section 1 of, and Part I of the Schedule to, the Statute Law Revision Act 1888.

This section was repealed by section 87 of, and Schedule 5 to, the Ecclesiastical Jurisdiction Measure 1963.

Section 13
In this section, the words "and be it enacted" were repealed by section 1 of, and Part I of the Schedule to, the Statute Law Revision Act 1888.

This section was repealed by section 87 of, and Schedule 5 to, the Ecclesiastical Jurisdiction Measure 1963.

See also

Act of Uniformity
Putting away of Books and Images Act 1549

Notes

References
Williams, Perry, The Later Tudors: England, 1574–1603 pp. 44–45 Oxford: Oxford University Press 1995

External links
Text of Act of Uniformity 1549
Documents Illustrative of English Church History, edited by Henry Gee and William John Hardy (London: Macmillan, 1914)
Digital Reproduction of the Original Act on the Parliamentary Archives catalogue

1549 in law
1549 in England
Uniformity
History of Cornwall
Christianity and law in the 16th century
1549 in Christianity